Cruella de Vil is a fictional character in British author Dodie Smith's 1956 novel The Hundred and One Dalmatians. A pampered and glamorous London heiress and fashion designer, she appears in Walt Disney Productions' 17th animated feature film, 101 Dalmatians (1961), voiced by Betty Lou Gerson; in Disney's 101 Dalmatians II: Patch's London Adventure (2002), voiced by Susanne Blakeslee; in Disney's live-action 101 Dalmatians (1996) and 102 Dalmatians (2000), portrayed by Glenn Close; as well as Cruella (2021), portrayed by Emma Stone; and in many other Disney sequels and spin-offs.

In most of her incarnations, Cruella kidnaps the 15 puppies of the main character, Dalmatian Pongo, intending to turn them into fur coats along with other Dalmatian puppies she legally bought before. In the live-action Disney film, it is revealed that the reason Cruella chooses to skin puppies is that when short-haired dogs grow older their fur becomes very coarse and does not sell as well in the fur fashion industry as the fine, soft fur of puppies.

The character became a pop-culture icon and a famous symbol of dastardly greed, vanity and evil. Disney's Cruella ranked 39th on AFI's list "100 Years...100 Heroes and Villains".

Name
The name Cruella de Vil is a pun of the words cruel and devil, an allusion that is emphasized by having her English country house nicknamed 'Hell Hall'. The name 'de Vil' is also a literary allusion to Bram Stoker's Dracula (1897), in which the realty firm Mitchell, Sons & Candy write a letter to Lord Godalming, informing him that the purchaser of a house in Piccadilly, London is "a foreign nobleman, Count De Ville". Count De Ville, however, proves to be an alias for Count Dracula himself.

It is also believed that the inspiration for the name began in 1939 when Dodie Smith purchased a new Rolls-Royce 25/30 "Sedanca de Ville" motorcar in which she and her pet Dalmatian "Pongo" frequently travelled, which also formed the basis of the cartoon imagery of Cruella's own motorcar. In automotive coachbuilding, the term "de Ville" had originally indicated a vehicle with a separate compartment for the driver or chauffeur but by mid-twentieth century simply bespoke ostentatious luxury, as befits the overprivileged Cruella.

In some translations of the name, other wordplay is used to similar effect as the name in English. For instance:

In Bulgarian, her name is Круела Де Вил (Kruela De Vil), but some properties use her translated name, Злобара Де Мон (Zlobara De Mon)—"злоба" meaning malice, spite, or malevolence.
In Dutch, the name remains 'De Vil'. By coincidence, the Dutch verb for 'skinning' is villen, and vil is the conjugation of this verb for the first person singular.
In Finnish, she is known as Julmia Juoninen, a name formed from the words julma (cruel) and juoni (plot, scheme).
In French, she is referred as 'Cruella d'Enfer'—literally meaning 'Cruella of Hell' or 'from Hell'.
In Hungarian, her name is Szörny Ella (Ella Monster) in the books and Szörnyella de Frász (Monsterella de Fright) in her Disney appearances.
In Italian, she is called 'Crudelia De Mon'—a pun on crudele ('cruel') and demonio ('devil')
In Polish (among other translations), the character is known as 'Cruella De Mon'—a play on the word 'demon'.
In Brazilian Portuguese, Cruella is known as 'Cruela Cruel', which straightforwardly stems from 'cruel'.
In both Spanish and European Portuguese, the name remains 'De Vil', but instead of representing "devil", it represents words for "from vileness" or "from villainy".
In Russian, her name is Стервелла Де Виль (Stervella De Vil), from "стерва" (bitch, as a human character derogative term).
In Ukrainian, her name is Лютелла Де Віль (Lyutella De Vil), a pun on the word "лють" (cruelty). She is also known as Лютелла Де Явол (Lyutella De Yavol), where Де Явол is very similar to the word "диявол" (devil).

The Hundred and One Dalmatians novel

In the original story, Cruella is depicted as a pampered and glamorous London heiress. She was a former schoolmate of Mrs. Dearly (one of the owners of the original Dalmatians), but Mrs. Dearly says they were not friends because Cruella frightened her. As a child, Cruella had one black plait and one white plait, and was eventually expelled for drinking ink. However, she appears to be on friendlier terms with Mrs. Dearly by the beginning of the novel, before Cruella steals the Dearlys Dalmatian puppies, having noted they would make "enchanting fur coats" and that no one had thought of making coats of dog skins before.

The One Hundred and One Dalmatians describes Cruella as the last descendant of a prosperous and notorious family; she appears wealthy, but is in fact heavily in debt. She is married to a furrier, whose first name is never mentioned by anyone, and many characters remark that Cruella only married him for his occupation. When Mrs. Dearly asks Cruella what her married name is, Cruella retorts that, in contrast to the usual patriarchal custom, she has made her husband adopt her surname as his own; however, she and her husband have no children, meaning the line will still die out with her. Cruella is portrayed as the tyrannical figure in the marriage, and her husband as a meek, subservient man who seldom speaks and obeys his wife entirely. He keeps his entire fur collection in the house so Cruella can wear whichever she likes. Her favorite is a white mink cloak, which she usually wears with tight satin dresses and jewels. The dresses and jewels are always in contrasting color - for instance, a black dress with ropes of pearls, or a red dress with ropes of emeralds. Her jewels are later revealed to be mostly sham, however.

Cruella's chauffeur-driven car is black-and-white striped; Mr. Dearly describes it as "a moving zebra crossing". Cruella boasts that it has the loudest horn in London, which she insists on sounding for the Dearly couple. When Cruella has guests for dinner, all of her food is strangely-colored and tastes strongly of pepper. When Mr. Dearly comments she might find her mink cloak too warm for a mild autumn evening, Cruella laughs that she never finds anything too warm; she constantly stokes a roaring fire and complains of being cold despite the unbearable heat. The flat is portrayed as a luxurious version of Hell, with all the rooms being made of marble and colored garishly in green, red or black. Her guests also meet her abused white Persian cat, whom Cruella freely admits she would have killed if the cat wasn't worth so much money.

Cruella happens to be in the house when the puppies are born, as Mrs. Dearly reluctantly invited the de Vil's to a dinner party along with her other guests. When the puppies arrive, the other guests leave politely, but Cruella barges in to the broom cupboard to see the puppies. Revolted by the spotless skins of the newborns, she offers to have them drowned at once; this is her way of getting rid of animals she views as worthless, as she has drowned dozens of her own cat's kittens. The Dearlys assure her the spots will come later, but refuse to sell the puppies. Upon a second visit to the house, Cruella picks up the mature puppies and treats them like clothing to be worn. A third visit occurs when the Dearlys are out, and Cruella, having bought up all the other Dalmatian puppies she could find in the area, keeps the Nannies talking while hired thieves steal the puppies for her. However, her plan backfires when the Dearlys start advertising for the missing puppies and the publicity makes selling Dalmatian coats too risky. Cruella demands the Baduns, caretakers of her old estate of Hell Hall, kill the puppies at once, but the dogs escape after she leaves. Cruella pursues them, but her love of fire causes her to stop and applaud the spectacle of a bakery burning to the ground, buying the dogs more time.

When the Dalmatians return to London, they and the Persian cat enact vengeance on Cruella by destroying all of Mr. de Vil's fur stock. Most of the furs were not yet paid off, and the de Vils flee England to get away from their debts, supposedly going in for plastic raincoats instead of fur. Cruella's black side of her hair goes white, and the white side goes an off-greenish shade, from the shock.

The Starlight Barking novel

In Smith's 1967 sequel, The Starlight Barking, Cruella and her husband return to England and start a business selling metallic plastics. Cruella, while still obsessed with heat and pepper, has lost her obsession with fur, replacing all her coats, sheets, cloaks etc. with metallic plastic versions that are as impenetrable as armor. She has dyed her hair to its normal black and white state. When Sirius puts all the humans to sleep, the dogs and cats believe Cruella is responsible and decide to kill her once and for all, until they find she is asleep like everyone else and no longer a threat to them due to having lost interest in fur. It is noted that she is the only one of the sleepers who does not look peaceful (even her husband snores away happily) but instead is grim and unhappy even in sleep. She has repainted her house and removed the marble (artificial marble, according to the White Cat), so the walls now resemble angular psychedelic paintings, many of them portraits of herself.

Animated adaptations

One Hundred and One Dalmatians (1961 film)

Disney's animated version of Cruella first appeared in 1961's One Hundred and One Dalmatians, in which she is voiced by Betty Lou Gerson and animated by Marc Davis who together crafted her into an iconic and memorable character. Cruella is one of the few characters to be completely controlled by a single animator, and Davis claimed that Betty Lou Gerson's vocal performance was his greatest inspiration when it came to the character. Disney based its version of Cruella on the personality and mannerisms of Tallulah Bankhead, and her long, lanky physical design came from Mary Wickes, who served as her live-action model. The cool detachment of the original character was replaced by a crazed mania, in which Cruella only barely clung to a sheen of glamour. For unexplained reasons, Cruella's cat and husband were omitted from the Disney version. Cruella drives a very distinctive automobile, colored red and black, which strongly resembles a Mercedes-Benz 500K Cabriolet.

In 2002, Forbes ranked Disney's Cruella as the thirteenth wealthiest fiction character, citing the single 65-year-old has a net worth of $875 million, obtained through inheritance. She was also listed as the 39th greatest villain in American cinema in AFI's 100 Years... 100 Heroes and Villains. Moreover, in Ultimate Disney's Top 30 Disney Villains Countdown, Cruella ranked #6.

In the film, Cruella is wealthy, rude and spoiled. She makes fun of Anita Radcliffe and her husband Roger for making a living from songwriting. Cruella desires to make a fur coat from the Radcliffes' Dalmatians, but does not tell the Radcliffes this, simply demanding to know when the puppies arrive. Upon the night of the puppies' birth, Cruella is at first dismayed to find their coats completely spotless, but cheers up when Anita tells her that the spots will appear in a few weeks. Cruella makes an offer to buy the puppies, all the while mocking Roger for his songwriting career and splattering Roger and Pongo with ink from her pen. When Roger finally stands up to her and tells her the puppies are not for sale, she furiously ends her friendship with Anita and storms out, vowing vengeance.

Cruella hires two thieves named Jasper and Horace Badun to steal the puppies, which they do. Both Roger and the police immediately suspect her, but the latter fail to find anything despite still investigating. However, fearing the ongoing investigation, Cruella goes to her ancestral home in Suffolk where the puppies are being kept, and angrily demands that her henchmen kill and skin the puppies for her that very night, exploding a bottle of wine in the fireplace to drive home her point. The next morning, Cruella learns that the puppies have escaped the house in the night, being rescued by Pongo and Perdita. She and her henchmen set off in pursuit, and she berates Jasper and Horace for reckless driving, despite her obviously worse driving skills.

The next day, on Christmas Eve, Cruella, Jasper, and Horace track the Dalmatians to Dinsford. While driving her car across town, she sees a long procession of black puppies walking past her into a van. Realizing at the last second that the puppies are the Dalmatians in disguise, she furiously pursues the van in her car and tries to ram the van over a cliff. Jasper attempts the same thing, but Horace panics and causes their truck to swerve and crash into Cruella instead. Cruella throws a tantrum among the wreckage of the two vehicles as the van gets away.

The film features a song, written by Mel Leven, using her name as the title, sung by the Dalmatians' owner Roger (Bill Lee), who holds the woman in contempt. The lyric begins with: "Cruella de Vil, Cruella de Vil. If she doesn't scare you, no evil thing will...", possibly foreshadowing the deranged, glowing-red-eyed face Cruella assumes while chasing the van.

101 Dalmatians II: Patch's London Adventure

Cruella returns in 101 Dalmatians II: Patch's London Adventure, once again as the main antagonist, where she is now voiced by Susanne Blakeslee. The film picks up where the previous film left off, establishing that Cruella was arrested and exposed as the mastermind behind the theft of Pongo and Perdita's 15 puppies, but was not sent to prison for her crimes. She is instead placed under a restraining order forbidding her from any contact with the Radcliffes or their dogs, and on probation which prohibits her from purchasing any more furs. Her fancy car, after being wrecked in the first film, is reduced to a shoddily fixed mess, which falls apart when she tries to drive it.

Cruella initially enlists the help of a painter named Lars, to cure her of her obsession for fur coats. For a while, he paints beautiful spotted paintings for her, soothing her mania, but eventually starts to regress, demanding he make paintings out of puppy skins and rehiring Jasper and Horace to steal the puppies again accordingly. When Lars, an animal lover, refuses to harm the puppies, Cruella reverts to her original plan to kill the dogs for a coat, eventually going completely insane once the puppies escape again. After an extended chase, she winds up stranded in the Thames, where she is arrested and imprisoned in an insane asylum. Jasper and Horace, after this second debacle, renounce her completely and go legitimate, starting a shop together.

101 Dalmatians: The Series

Cruella is the main antagonist of the 101 Dalmatians animated series, voiced by April Winchell in the majority of the episodes, and Tress MacNeille in the episodes "Fungus Among Us" and "Close But No Cigar". This Cruella is based on Glenn Close's portrayal from the live-action film, but with Marc Davis's design from the animated film. She does not wear fur, usually does not smoke (although in the episodes "Smoke Detectors" and "Hail to the Chief" she did) and is totally sane, yet still temperamental and impatient. Her villainous plot in the show was to steal the Dearlys' farm from them, using the puppies as a ransom. Her mother Malevola de Vil demands she do this, and Cruella also was denied the farm by old Widow Smedly the first time she tried to buy it, incensing her and beginning her obsession.

Cruella is an archetypal corporate villain who will seize on any scheme to make money, and Jasper and Horace are her oft-fired company employees, in this version. Cruella's schemes involve such things as drilling oil from the swamp near Dearly farm (thereby polluting it), buying Kanine Krunchies and replacing the nutritious ingredients with sawdust and chalk, or sending Jasper and Horace to drive out the owners of Mom and Pop's Grocery Store so she can buy it herself.

In the Christmas Special "A Christmas Cruella", it is revealed that, as a child, Cruella had wanted nothing more in life than a Dalmatian puppy. Her parents however never celebrated holidays or birthdays with her and always left her in the care of foreign nannies while they went on vacations, sending her nothing but clothes as gifts. She had a single white streak in her hair as a child. She finally snapped and turned evil in her teens, when her parents led her to believe they would be home for Christmas with her dream puppy, and then sent cardboard cutouts of themselves and a puppy instead. Her hair also turned half-white at this time.

In the series finale, she uses an inflatable bodysuit to disguise herself as a shapely blonde surfer clad in a bikini. She plans to seduce Roger, to prompt Anita to divorce him so she (Cruella) can buy the farm. When Anita goes swimming, Cruella asks Roger to go swimming with her and then tries to kiss him. Her inflatable suit is popped by the puppies' chicken friend, turning Cruella into the shape of a surfboard.

101 Dalmatian Street series

Cruella makes an appearance in the series 101 Dalmatian Street and is voiced by Michelle Gomez. Acting as an alternate continuation, the series takes place sixty years after the events of the original 1961 film (2021). Cruella's great-nephew, Hunter de Vil, plans to capture the family of Doug and Delilah, descendants of Pongo and Perdita that currently live in Camden Town, and bring them to his great-aunt, now in Switzerland. However, Hunter is unaware that she intends to kill the Dalmatian family to make the fur coat. When he finds out, he turns on her and causes her to be injured by a machine. She later is arrested for her crimes.

In this adaptation, Cruella is in either her late 80s or early 90s. She has lost her hair, but not her mobility or her vanity. She hides her aging with a special spray.

Other Disney animations
Susanne Blakeslee also voiced Cruella in Disney's House of Mouse, which featured a running gag in which she inspects dogs from other Disney films with a measuring ruler. She also appeared in Mickey's House of Villains as one of the main villains who helps Jafar take over the House of Mouse for Halloween night.

Cruella also appears in Disney's Christmas Favorites during the segment "Santa Cruella".

In The Simpsons short Welcome to the Club, Cruella appears along with other Disney Villains trying to convince Lisa Simpson how fun it is to be a villain.

Live-action adaptations

101 Dalmatians (1996 film)

Glenn Close portrays Cruella de Vil in the 1996 film 101 Dalmatians and its 2000 sequel 102 Dalmatians. The film reinvents Cruella as the vindictive, snobbish and very glamorous magnate of an haute couture fashion house, "House of De Vil", which specializes in fur couture. The character of Anita (played by Joely Richardson) is a couturière and employee of De Vil. Unlike the animated film, the live-action version provides another reason as to why Cruella wants to make the puppies into coats at a young age: their fur wouldn't be as soft and as fine as when they fully grow up. At the start of the film, it is revealed that Cruella has secretly had her henchmen slaughter a white Siberian tiger at London Zoo for its pelt. The suspicions and accusations of the Dearly family force Cruella to step up her plans to make the puppies into a coat, the puppies escaping while her henchmen are preparing to do the work and Cruella being subsequently thrown into a vat of molasses and a pig pen when she tries to track them to a farm. At the end of the film, she and her henchmen are arrested and sent to prison, with the Dearlys able to buy a large house after Roger's latest video game (inspired by the puppies' ordeal) proves a success when he also makes Cruella the villain within the game's storyline.

Along with Close's performance, Cruella's costumes (by Anthony Powell and Rosemary Burrows) received appreciative attention, including a spread in Vanity Fair. Claws were applied to her gloves, while her necklaces were made from teeth, to add to the idea that Cruella enjoyed wearing parts of dead animals. Nails were also projected from the heels to make them especially vicious in appearance. Some of her clothes were made out of leather or PVC, and Cruella always wore much makeup. She is seen in the film always smoking to give the appearance of a mysterious "villain".

This film increased the physical comedy of the Disney animated film, even veering into more juvenile humor, such as Cruella falling into a vat of old molasses. Close's performance was universally well-received and her sex appeal as the character was also credited. Close has commented on how demanding the slapstick physicality of the role was while wearing nail-heeled boots and corsets. Close also insisted that she fall into the molasses herself for genuine acting, as opposed to delegating it to a stunt double. The live-action film was not as critically successful as the animated movie, however.

102 Dalmatians

In 102 Dalmatians, while under effect of Dr. Ivan Pavlov's hypnotherapy treatment, Cruella is cured of her fur addiction and released from prison on parole, three years after the events of the first film. She insists on being called "Ella" because "Cruella sounds so... cruel". Reformed, she becomes completely devoted to saving animals, and is appalled by even the smallest sight of fur fashion, boarding up all her fur clothing and the drawing of herself in a Dalmatian puppy coat. She quits her characteristic habits, such as wearing fur clothing, long nails, extravagant hairstyles, and of course, smoking.

This new persona however is not to last for long, since the effects of Big Ben's chimes manage to undo the conditioning, reverting Cruella to her former self. Her old habits return, with Cruella redesigning the sketch of the original Dalmatian coat to include a hood specifically so that she can use three new puppies to make the coat on top of the original ninety-nine puppies required; the chosen extra three being the children of Dipstick, one of the Dearlys' original fifteen puppies. Despite her efforts to distract attention from herself by framing the owner of the Second Chance Dog Shelter for her crimes (the only person who stands to benefit if she reverts to her old behavior, as her parole states that her fortune will go to dog shelters in the Westminster area and Second Chance is the only such shelter), her plans are discovered by her parole officer, also Dipstick's owner.

Cruella's accomplice this time is French furrier Jean Pierre Le Pelt, who carries out the actual thefts and helps design the coat. He is trapped in one of his own coats when it is sewn shut during a fight in a sweatshop in France, while the stolen puppies lure Cruella into a trap where she is literally baked into a massive cake. She is arrested, along with Le Pelt, both being sentenced to life in prison for their actions.

Cruella

Cruella, a live-action film that explores De Vil's backstory by Disney, was announced in 2011. Screenwriter Aline Brosh McKenna, best known for writing The Devil Wears Prada, was hired to write the screenplay, with Glenn Close serving as the executive producer, Andrew Gunn and Marc Platt as the producers, and Alex Timbers as director, while Kelly Marcel was set to revise the script originally written by McKenna. Emma Stone was cast in the titular role of Estella "Cruella" de Vil in 2016. Timbers dropped to direct the live-action Cruella de Vil film due to scheduling conflicts in December 2018 and was replaced with Craig Gillespie. The following year, Emma Thompson joined the film as Baroness von Hellman, while Tony McNamara and Dana Fox were hired to write the recent version of the screenplay. Joel Fry, Paul Walter Hauser, Mark Strong, Emily Beecham and Kirby Howell-Baptiste joined the cast. The film was simultaneously released to theatres and on premium video on demand through Disney+ on May 28, 2021.

In the film, Cruella grew up as Estella Miller, the daughter of Catherine, who is expelled from her first school due to her temper, provoking several fights. When Catherine visits a mansion for financial support, she is killed by Dalmatians after Estella accidentally provoked them into chasing her, causing Estella to run to London by hiding in a bin lorry, where she is aided by Horace and Jasper, dyeing her distinctive black-and-white hair to better hide herself. As an adult, she gets a job in a prominent fashion boutique that brings her to the attention of famed designer Baroness von Hellman, but Estella soon realizes that the Baroness was the woman who her mother had visited before her death. Planning to retrieve a necklace of her mother's that the Baroness has claimed as her own, Estella creates the identity of "Cruella" to create a distraction during the party, which begins a longer campaign against the Baroness. During her efforts, Estella learns that the Baroness is in fact her biological mother; she intended to have her baby killed after birth, but her valet John gave the baby to Catherine, who was a maid in the house at the time. With this knowledge, Estella provokes a confrontation with the Baroness and then fakes her own death in a manner that gives the impression that the Baroness killed her; she is then arrested as a result and Estella inherits her entire fortune as Cruella. In a post-credit scene Anita and Roger each receive a dalmatian puppy, Pongo and Perdita respectively, born of the dalmatians owned by the Baronness.

Once Upon a Time

Cruella appears in the fourth, fifth and seventh seasons of the TV series Once Upon a Time, where she is portrayed as an adult by Victoria Smurfit, and as a child by Milli Wilkinson, as a witch who possesses the power to control animals. A childhood sociopath, Cruella poisoned her father and two stepfathers. Her mother Madeline (Anna Galvin) kept her locked inside the house to prevent her from harming others. As an adult, she met Isaac (the Author) (Patrick Fischler), who was posing as a regular journalist; through him, she learned that her world, a perpetual 1920s England, was one of many. Smitten with her, the Author gave her the power to control animals. Cruella used the new power to have her mother's dalmatians kill her, and killed them and made their fur into a coat. In a struggle to prevent the Author from writing another note about her, the vial of magic ink spills on her causing her blonde hair to turn into the iconic black and white. However, the pen had a remnant of ink in it, which the Author used to write down a note that would, from there on, prevent Cruella from taking another life: "Cruella De Vil can no longer take away the life of another". Cruella kept this secret, as intimidation would still work for her needs.

She later ended up in the Enchanted Forest, where she became infamous for turning animals into outerwear. Rumplestiltskin (Robert Carlyle) recruited her, Ursula (Merrin Dungey) and Maleficent (Kristin Bauer van Straten) to acquire the Dark Curse, but he double-crossed them and left them to be killed by the Chernabog. Escaping together, Cruella joined the two in trying to get assistance from Snow White (Ginnifer Goodwin) and Prince Charming (Josh Dallas) in preventing the Evil Queen (Lana Parrilla) from casting the curse. The Tree of Wisdom they consulted refused to answer due to Snow's pregnancy. Along with Ursula, Cruella was asked by Maleficent to act as a guard while she went through childbirth as a dragon. As a result, Cruella was sucked into a portal with Ursula and the child to the Land Without Magic, due to a spell cast by the Apprentice. She and the Sea Witch steal the egg the baby was in and use the magic to prolong their youth in the magicless world. She later married Mr. Feinberg and lived in a mansion off Long island in New York.

In the present day, Cruella's marriage had fallen apart as the FBI was repossessing her husband's belongings. Mr. Gold and Ursula convinced her to join them in finding the Author to get happy endings. Cruella played little importance in the plot, until the Author was released from the book; unable to kill him herself, she pretended to threaten Henry Mills's (Jared S. Gilmore) life to force Emma Swan (Jennifer Morrison) and Regina to do so. However, Emma confronted her, not knowing the restriction the Author placed on Cruella, and magically blasted her off a cliff to her death.

After her death, Cruella ended up in the Underworld, a purgatory run by the deity Hades. While there, she met David's twin brother James; they quickly struck up a romantic relationship due to their similar personalities. When the heroes arrived with Gold to rescue the recently deceased Killian Jones (Colin O'Donoghue), Cruella was among the deceased of whom they came across. In hopes of returning to life, Cruella appealed to Henry, the new Author, to use the quill to bring her back to life. Later, she helped Regina locate the grave of her lost love Daniel, who had since moved on to a better place. Mistaking David for James, Cruella made a move on him, then informed him of the hostility James held toward his brother. Cruella and James then hatched a plan to get out the Underworld by delivering Hades the child of Robin Hood and Zelena. James pretended to be David and put a magic-neutralizing bracelet on Emma, while he and Cruella took the baby. They took Emma and Robin to the docks, planning to throw them into the River of Lost Souls, until David and Hook stopped them. David ended up throwing James into the River and Cruella ran off.

Once Hades's heart was restarted, and he planned to leave the Underworld with Zelena, Cruella teamed up with the Blind Witch; Hades offered to let them rule the Underworld in his absence and help trap the heroes there. Delighted with the idea of getting to torment souls for eternity, Cruella agreed to the deal.

Following the heroes' escape back to Storybrooke, Hook teamed up with the deceased King Arthur to locate the storybook so they could tell Emma how to defeat Hades. They went to find Cruella at the diner, where she reacted with disdain towards seeing Hook, but she coyly regarded Arthur with keen interest because of his good looks. When questioned about the haunting booth, Cruella admitted she destroyed it for good, since she didn't want anyone moving on if it meant she had to be stuck in the Underworld, too. Hook then pressed her about the book's whereabouts, which Cruella was surprisingly forthcoming about. She knew they would eventually figure out the truth even if she lied, and then told them that she put the book in the River of Souls. Cruella was later dethroned by Arthur who then ruled the Underworld for fifty years as she became a depressed and bitter woman who drank in the local bar with Sir Mordred.

In the seventh season, the Wish Realm version of Cruella is an accomplice to Rumplestiltskin.

Descendants

Cruella De Vil appears in the 2015 Disney Channel Original Movie Descendants. She is portrayed by actress Wendy Raquel Robinson. Along with other villains, Cruella has been exiled to the Isle of the Lost, where she has lived for at least twenty years. She has a 14-year-old son, Carlos, whom she abuses and treats like a servant, making him sleep near the bear traps she uses to guard her fur coats.

Other adaptations

Live productions

Cruella appears in The 101 Dalmatians Musical, the stage musical adaptation of the novel. She was portrayed by Rachel York; however, the actress announced on her blog that she had stepped down from the role of Cruella de Vil to pursue other projects. The role was taken over by Sara Gettelfinger. In the 2022 musical adaptation of the novel, Cruella was portrayed by Kate Fleetwood.

Cruella is the only meetable character from the 101 Dalmatians franchise at the Disney Parks and Resorts, and is usually located on Main Street, U.S.A.

Cruella is also one of the Disney Villains Mickey fights in Disney's Hollywood Studios version of Fantasmic! Nighttime Show Spectacular in Walt Disney World. In Disney On Ice "Celebrations", Cruella was one of the Villains who appears during the Halloween Party.

Audio production
In 1996, the BBC adapted Dodie Smith's Novel into a full-cast musical audio dramatization, starring Patricia Hodge as Cruella. This version is primarily faithful to the source material, but still has some differences from the original. Cruella's husband argues with her more than in the novel, and Cruella's love of heat is at one point attributed to her simply being cold all the time, whereas in the book it is just a characteristic, among many, indicating she may not be fully human. Cruella and her husband do not leave England at the end of the story, and their fate is left unknown. Furthermore, the Dearlys never figure out that Cruella is behind the theft of the dogs. This version, however, is currently the only adapted version which includes Cruella's husband, her love of heat and pepper, her cat, her zebra-striped car, and the fact her hair changes color at the end of the story.

In this version, Cruella and the Baduns are given their own song, "It's Their Furs", which they sing together when Cruella orders the brothers to kill the pups. During the song, Cruella dictates the furs are to be labeled "Hers and Hers" instead of "His and Hers", implying that her husband will not get this first batch. It is later revealed that there is still the risk Mr. de Vil will sell Dalmatian furs down the line, prompting the Dalmatians and the White Persian Cat to destroy Mr. de Vil's fur stocks, as in the novel. Amazon Audible later released this production as an audiobook, available for streaming online or through the app.

Video games
Cruella appears as the main antagonist in the 101 Dalmatians franchise video games 101 Dalmatians: Escape from DeVil Manor (1997) and 102 Dalmatians: Puppies to the Rescue (2000).

Cruella is a playable character to unlock for a limited time in Disney Magic Kingdoms.

Books

Kingdom Keepers series
Cruella first appears in Power Play, the fourth book of the young-adult book series by Ridley Pearson, Kingdom Keepers, as a member of the Overtakers, a group of Disney Villains. She is valuable to them since she knows the ways of the modern world. Cruella works with the Evil Queen to free Maleficent and Chernabog, while making sure the Keepers stay off their trail. Using DHI technology, she and the Queen head for the power facility and shut down the electricity, allowing Maleficent and Chernabog to escape their cells.

In the following book Shell Game, she assists the Queen and Maleficent in stealing Walt's original notes on Chernabog from the Archives. She then boards the Dream for the two-week cruise, along with the rest of the Overtakers. She commands the Lion King''' hyenas, Happy and Howley, having them patrol the ship to keep the Keepers from finding Chernabog.

In the seventh book "The Insider", Cruella joins Tia Dalma, the Queen and Judge Doom's group in Toontown; she calls an army of animals to the area with a simple command, only to be knocked out by Amanda's telekinesis. Finn later discovers Cruella had been living in a luxurious decommissioned train compartment and tries strangling her to death. She flees in terror, but has a wrench tossed at her. She is last seen slumped on the ground, bleeding.

Evil Thing: A Tale of that De Vil Woman
In the seventh book of the Villains series by Serena Valentino, Cruella De Vil tells her story in the first person starting with her childhood. She describes herself growing up, with her father dying at an early age after gifting her daughter a pair of jade earrings that were said to have been cursed by the Odd Sisters, figures in the fairy tale books Cruella loved to read as a child. Her mother is a self-absorbed socialite, hardly ever seeing her daughter and giving her gifts, which Cruella equates to her mother loving her. The only two people that truly care about her are her governess, Miss Pricket, and her friend Anita who comes from a lower-class family.

When they attend school together, Cruella defends Anita from the bullies, and after school intends for Anita and her to travel around the world together. When Cruella puts on her jade earrings, she experiences a surge of power and becomes bossy and mean. She wears them when confronting the school headmistress at Anita's treatment. During the holidays following their first year at school, Cruella decides to have the staff's holiday dinner celebration downstairs, but her mother arrives in horror, and forbids Cruella from going back to school and is determined to find her a husband, as well as banning her from seeing Anita.

On Cruella's next birthday, her father's lawyer delivers a female Dalmatian puppy named Perdita, which apparently had been set up by her father prior to his death. After her birthday celebration, she is confronted by her mother about having a puppy, and her mother jokes to Cruella about having the puppy turned into a muff. A horrified Cruella is calmed when Anita arrives from school. At a dinner, Anita reveals she is going to typing school, which leaves Cruella feeling alone. Later, the two fight while Cruella is wearing the earrings, and Perdita urinates on Cruella's fur coat, which leads to her throwing Anita and Perdita out of the house.

Cruella eventually marries a man named Jack and confident in their future together, signs over her fortune to her mother. At 25 Jack dies in a fire, supposedly of suicide after seeing the massive amount of debt he had. With just the clothes on her back, Cruella goes to an old mansion called Hell Hall which her father had set aside from her in the case of an emergency. She then goes to meet with Anita, whom she has kept in touch with supposedly for updates on Perdita, and finds herself furious with Anita. She then vows to herself to get back at her, and decides to do so by taking Perdita's coming litter of puppies and turning them into a coat for her mother.

When Cruella reveals the plan to her mother, her mother is horrified and demands she return to Hell Hall. Cruella goes ahead with her plan and rounds up not only Perdita's litter, but all the Dalmatian puppies from miles around. Before she can kill them though, the puppies escape. Cruella then descends further into madness, rambling about another grand scheme to get those puppies. The novel ends with a note from Serena Valentino, saying she visited Hell Hall to take down Cruella's story and that she still wears the jade earrings to this day.

Be Careful What You Wish Fur
In the fourth volume of the Disney Chills series by Vera Strange, Delia is a girl at a private school who yearns to be the highest influence in fashion at her private school. The House of De Vil is a popular fashion house that all the girls strive to wear. One day, Delia finds a fur coat in an alley and talks herself into taking it. Delia is soon tormented by the unseen phantom of Cruella De Vil, who claims it is her coat.

In popular culture
Cruella de Vil has become one of the most recognizable literary and film villains, and as such as featured prominently in popular culture:
In the Hey Arnold! episode "Curly's Girl", when Rhonda breaks up with Curly after pretending to be his girlfriend, Helga calls her "Cruella".
In the 1994 film Trading Mom Jeremy Martin strongly disapproves of his older sister's choice for their new mother, a wealthy and fussy French woman, during their first visit to the Mommy Market stating she looks like Cruella de Vil due to her evident liking of cigarettes and her extravagant appearance.
In the 1998 remake of The Parent Trap, Annie James tells her mother that her father is marrying a woman as evil as Cruella de Vil. This could also be considered an inside joke as Cruella de Vil is also the head of a prestigious London fashion house, just like Elizabeth James (played by Natasha Richardson). Furthermore, and coincidentally her sister Joely Richardson played Anita, Cruella's most trusted employee, in the 1996 remake of 101 Dalmatians.
An inflatable representation of the character appeared at the 2012 Summer Olympics opening ceremony in London alongside other villains, Lord Voldemort, The Queen of Hearts, Captain Hook and Child Catcher, to haunt children's dreams – before the arrival of a group of over thirty Mary Poppins who descended with their umbrellas to defeat them – in a segment celebrating British children's literature.
In Lois & Clark: The New Adventures of Superman, a tabloid once published a story accusing Lois Lane of cheating on her husband Clark Kent with Superman. Lois commented she was under Cruella on the popularity scale.
In the first six seasons of the History Channel series American Restoration, Tyler Dale wears his hair dyed half-blonde, emulating Cruella's hairstyle.

In music
The Queen song "Let Me Entertain You" features the lyrics "I'll Cruella de Vil You!"
"The Cruel One" by Children 18:3 is a song about 101 Dalmatians, mentioning Cruella de Vil by name in the chorus.
The Deadsy song "Cruella" is written about Cruella de Vil.
Rock band The Replacements recorded a cover of the song "Cruella de Vil" for a compilation of Disney covers. It also appears on their 1997 compilation album, All for Nothing / Nothing for All.
Spanish singer Alaska made a cover of song "Cruella de Vil" for the Spanish version of the 101 Dalmatians live-action film.
Separate volumes of Disney's Greatest Hits include covers of "Cruella de Vil" the from the 1961 film, including one by teen singer and actress Selena Gomez, as well as a two covers (one big-band cover) by blues pianist and vocalist Dr. John.
Mark Campbell (lead vocalist of Jack Mack and the Heart Attack) sings the funky "Cruella De Vil" in 102 Dalmatians, and on the 2000 Disney Soundtrack Album.
American singer and performer Lady Gaga dressed up as Cruella de Vil for Halloween in 2010. The performer has had many outfits inspired by the villain.
American singer Melanie Martinez dyed half of her hair blonde, in the same vein as Cruella.
Late American rapper XXXTentacion, inspired by Cruella, dyed half of his hair blonde.
Cruella was briefly mentioned by Zelda, the villainess of The Swan Princess: The Mystery of the Enchanted Kingdom during her villain song along with the Wicked Witch of the West & Medusa.
"Crudelia" by Marracash is a song about a cruel woman, mentioning Cruella de Vil (Crudelia De Mon in Italian) by name.
In 2021, Chinese idol and member of NCT Dream's Renjun dyed half of his hair platinum blonde and black, in the same vein as Cruella.
In 2023, Chinese idol and member of SEVENTEEN’s Jun dyed a layer of his hair black over his platinum blonde dye in the same vein as Cruella.
"Tomboy" by South Korean girl group (G)I-dle is a song inspired by Cruella.
"Cruella D'Vil" An American Heavy Metal rock band formed by guitarist Justin Sayne.

Parodies/Derivations
In The Simpsons episode "Two Dozen and One Greyhounds", Mr. Burns plays the role of Cruella De Vil, stealing Santa's Little Helper and the puppies he sired to make them into a tuxedo. However, unlike Cruella, who has no hesitation in killing the puppies, Burns cannot bear to kill the puppies himself, because they are too cute. Declaring that he will never kill any animal that can perform good tricks again, Burns pays the Simpsons for the puppies, and he trains them to be world-class racing dogs.
In the Dexter's Laboratory episode "Peltra", the title character is a parody of Cruella de Vil.
Coco LaBouche, the antagonist of the 2000 Rugrats film Rugrats in Paris, shares many characteristics with Cruella.
Cruella de Vil appeared in the MAD episode "2012 Dalmatians", a mash-up of One Hundred and One Dalmatians and 2012.
In the Jessie episode "101 Lizards", Mrs. Chesterfield plays a role similar to Cruella de Vil.
Cruella de Vil appeared in a Robot Chicken skit called "101 Dalmatian Reproduction" in the episode "Yogurt in a Bag". In this short, Roger and Anita apologize to her after realizing Dalmatians breed more than rabbits (even siblings) and willingly give the adopted 85 puppies back to Cruella. Cruella notes everyone is the hero of their own story, earning some ire from Roger and Anita.
A parody of Cruella appears in the musical Twisted, a parody of Disney's Aladdin'' told from Jafar's point of view. In the title song, various Disney villains including Ursula, Scar, Gaston, Maleficent and Captain Hook, appear to Jafar and bemoan that they were unfairly portrayed and had good reasons for their actions. Cruella, conversely, states that all she wanted was to make a coat out of puppies, to which the other villains react in disgust.

Notes

References

External links
Cruella de Vil at the UltimateDisney.com Villains Countdown
 

101 Dalmatians
Villains in animated television series
Characters in British novels of the 20th century
Disney animated villains
Female characters in animated films
Female characters in film
Female characters in television
Fictional business executives
Fictional gentry
Fictional kidnappers
Fictional people from London
Fictional socialites
Female film villains
Female literary villains
Literary characters introduced in 1956
Film characters introduced in 1961